Y Ravine Cemetery is a Commonwealth War Graves Commission burial ground for the dead of World War I situated on the grounds of Beaumont Hamel Newfoundland Memorial Park near the French town of Beaumont-Hamel.

History and layout
"Y" Ravine runs east–west about 800 metres south of Beaumont-Hamel, from "Station Road" to the front line of July 1916. It was a deep ravine with steep sides, lined with dug-outs, and extending two short arms at the west end. The village of Beaumont-Hamel was attacked and reached on 1 July 1916, by units of the 29th Division which included the Royal Newfoundland Regiment, but it could not be held. It was attacked again and captured, with the ravine, by the 51st (Highland) Division on 13 November 1916. The Beaumont Hamel Newfoundland Memorial site, and the 29th and 51st Divisional Memorials within it, commemorate these engagements, and "Y" Ravine Cemetery is within the park.

The cemetery was made by the British V Corps in the spring of 1917, when these battlefields were cleared. It was called originally "Y" Ravine Cemetery No. 1. No. 2 cemetery was concentrated after the Armistice into Ancre British Cemetery, Beaumont-Hamel. There are now over 400 war casualties commemorated in this site. Of these, over a third are unidentified. The cemetery covers an area of 1,166 square metres and is enclosed by a rubble wall.

Commemoration
A special memorial was erected to 53 soldiers from the United Kingdom and eight from Newfoundland who are known or believed to be buried in the cemetery grounds.

External links
 
 

Canadian military memorials and cemeteries
Commonwealth War Graves Commission cemeteries in France
1917 establishments in France
World War I cemeteries in France
Battle of the Somme
Newfoundland in World War I
Cemeteries in Somme (department)